Justice Billings may refer to:

Franklin S. Billings Jr. (1922–2014), chief justice of the Vermont Supreme Court
Rhoda Billings (born 1937), associate justice of the North Carolina Supreme Court
William Howard Billings (1921–1991), associate justice of the Supreme Court of Missouri

See also
Judge Billings (disambiguation)